Kifissia is an Athens metro station in Kifisia, Athens, Greece. It is the northern terminus of the line 1. The station is situated at 25.655 km from the starting point in Piraeus. The station was opened on 10 August 1957 and was renovated in 2004. On the site of the current Athens Metro station, there was a station of the former Lavriou Square-Strofyli railway line at 15.500 km from Lavriou Square. It opened on 4 February 1885 and shut down on 8 August 1938.

History 
The station was opened on 10 August 1957 and was renovated in 2004. On the site of the current Athens Metro station, there was a station of the former Lavriou Square-Strofyli railway line at 15.500 km from Lavriou Square. It opened on 4 February 1885 and shut down on 8 August 1938.

Accidents and incidents

2009 Incident

2020 accident
On 7 July 2020, an Kifisias-bound terminating train hit the buffers as it failed to slow while entering the station, with reports of no deaths and a total of 8 and 10 lightly injured in the incident.

References

Athens Metro stations
Railway stations opened in 1957
1957 establishments in Greece